Victoria is the first goose to receive a prosthetic 3D printed beak. Victoria was found on the São Paulo coast in late 2015, without most of her beak. She was transferred to the care of the Friend of the Sea in collaboration with Animal Avengers, when Cícero Moraes was still part of the team. It is not clear how Victoria lost her beak. A 3D printed prosthetic beak was attached by veterinarians of the University of São Paulo.

See also
 List of individual birds

References 

Individual waterfowl
3D printed objects
Prosthetics
Geese
Individual animals in Brazil